Ern is a given name and a nickname of Ernest

 Ern Baxter (1914 - 1993), Canadian Pentecostal evangelist
 Ern Condon, Canadian politician
 Ern Klauer (1870 - 1915), South African engineer, trades-unionist, and politician
 Ern Pedler (1914 - 1989), horseman and writer
 Ern Phang (born 1976), Australian solicitor
 Ern Westmore (1904 - 1967), Hollywood make-up artist and actor
 Ern Wilmot (1898 - 1988), Australian rugby league player

Australian rules football players:
 Ern Cowley (1892 - 1975)
 Ern Elliott (1900 - ???)
 Ern Henfry (1921 - 2007)
 Ern Hocking (1882 - ???)
 Ern Jenkins (1879 – 1927)
 Ern McIntyre (1921 - 2003)
 Ern O'Regan (1907 - ???)
 Ern Penrose (1884 - ???)
 Ern Rowarth (born 1926)
 Ern Utting (1897 - 1948)

Fictional characters:
 Ern Malley, fictitious poet invented as a hoax
 Ern Marks, main character on Atlanta

See also
 Ernest
 Ernie
 Ernie (disambiguation)